"Bubblin" is a song written and performed by American rapper and singer Anderson .Paak. Paak also co-composed the track with musician Dem Jointz and its producers, Jahlil Beats and Antman Wonder. The song was released as a standalone single on May 17, 2018. At the 61st Grammy Awards, it won the award for Best Rap Performance alongside another Aftermath release, "King's Dead". The official remix features an additional verse from Busta Rhymes.

Reception
In a positive review from Pitchfork, Marcus J. Moore described the song as having a "trap-infused bounce beat with heavy drums and rumbling bass".

Certifications

References

2018 songs
American hip hop songs
Anderson .Paak songs
Grammy Award for Best Rap Performance
Songs written by Anderson .Paak
Songs written by Dem Jointz
Songs written by Jahlil Beats
Song recordings produced by Jahlil Beats